The women's 4 × 100 metre medley relay competition at the 1999 Pan Pacific Swimming Championships took place on August 29 at the Sydney International Aquatic Centre.  The last champion was the United States.

Records
Prior to this competition, the existing world and Pan Pacific records were as follows:

Results
All times are in minutes and seconds.

Heats
Heats weren't performed, as only seven teams had entered.

Final 
The final was held on August 29.

References

4 × 100 metre freestyle relay
1999 Pan Pacific Swimming Championships
1999 in women's swimming